John James Fraser (August 1, 1829 – November 24, 1896) was a New Brunswick (Canada) lawyer, judge, and politician.

John Fraser was born at Beaubears Island, New Brunswick. He married twice, the first time in 1867 to Martha Cumming. She died in 1871 and in 1884 he married Jane Maria Paulette Fisher, eldest daughter of former Premier, Charles Fisher.

In 1865 he won a seat in the colonial legislature as an Anti-Confederation Party MLA but lost his seat the next year. After Canadian confederation he ultimately joined the government and was appointed to the legislative council serving as president of the Executive Council from 1871 to 1872. That year he won a seat in the legislature and served as Provincial Secretary from 1872 to 1878 when he succeeded George E. King as Premier and Attorney-General.

Fraser was the first premier to give both the Acadian and the Irish sections of the Roman Catholic community effective representation in cabinet. Pierre-Amand Landry was made commissioner of public works, while Michael Adams became a surveyor-general with responsibility for administering crown lands.

In 1882, after running unsuccessfully for a seat in the federal parliament, Fraser left politics and was appointed to the provincial supreme court and from 1893 to 1896 he served as the ninth Lieutenant Governor of the province.

John Fraser died in 1896 in Genoa, Italy.

External links 
Biography at the Dictionary of Canadian Biography Online
Government of New Brunswick profile of Premier Fraser

1829 births
1896 deaths
Lawyers in New Brunswick
Judges in New Brunswick
Premiers of New Brunswick
Lieutenant Governors of New Brunswick
Canadian people of Scottish descent